Santiago Oñate Laborde (b. Mexico City, 1949) is a Mexican lawyer and politician affiliated with the Institutional Revolutionary Party (PRI).

Oñate Laborde graduated as lawyer from the Law Faculty in the Universidad Nacional Autónoma de México in 1972. He has gone on to serve in several positions inside the PRI and in the Mexican government. He was elected to the Chamber of Deputies in 1985 and to the Federal District Legislative Assembly upon expiration of his term as a federal legislator in 1998. In 1991 and 1992 he served as Ambassador to the Organization of American States and, in 1993, as the head of the Environmental Attorney's Office (Procuraduría Federal de Protección al Medio Ambiente or PROFEPA). In 1995 he was designated President of the PRI. He served for President Carlos Salinas as the head of the Presidency's Office (Oficina de la Presidencia).  President Ernesto Zedillo appointed him as Secretary of Labor.

In 1997, Oñate Laborde became Ambassador of Mexico to the United Kingdom, position he would hold until 2001, year when he became Ambassador of Mexico to the Netherlands. While serving as ambassador in the Netherlands, he also acted as the Permanent Representative of Mexico to the Organisation for the Prohibition of Chemical Weapons. His term as ambassador ended in 2003, but he would continue his activities in the OPCW, serving as legal adviser and later on as special adviser to the Director General. In 2013 he became the Permanent Observer of Mexico to the Council of Europe, in Strasbourg, France.

He pursued further studies at the London School of Economics and Political Science and at the University of Wisconsin, the latter of which also saw him as professor, along with the Universidad Autónoma Metropolitana, the Universidad Nacional Autónoma de México, and Leiden University.

Publications

"La Acción Procesal en la doctrina y en el derecho positivo mexicano", Mexico, 1972.
"El Estado y el Derecho", S. Oñate and D. Pantoja, Anuies-Edicol, Mexico, 1977.
"Evolución del Derecho Procesal Mexicano", in LXXV Años de Evolución Jurídica en el Mundo, UNAM, Instituto de Investigaciones Jurídicas, Mexico, 1978.
"Legal Aid in Mexico", in F. Zemans Legal Aid, Pinter Publishers, London, 1979.
"Legal Needs of the Poor and Disadvantaged", B. Garth, ed., Madison, Wisconsin, 1983.
"Los trabajadores migratorios frente a la justicia norteamericana", S.T.P.S.-FONEP, Mexico, 1983.
"El papel de juez en la resolución de Litigios Familiares", in International Congress of Comparative Law; National reports, H. Nakamura (ed.) Tokio, Japan, 1984.
"Administración de justicia y composición de conflictos laborales", in El Obrero Mexicano, Vol. 4, 21st century, Mexico, 1985.
"El Veto Suspensivo", in El Refrendo y las Relaciones entre el Congreso y el Ejecutivo, UNAM-Porrúa, 1987.
"El regimen de partidos", in Jornadas Jurídicas Nacionales, Fenase-Porrúa, 1987.
"Fuentes e interpretación del derecho parlamentario", in Derecho Parlamentario Iberoamericano, Porrúa, 1987.
"Nuevos mecanismos de defensa del ciudadano frente a la administración pública", in Administración Pública Contemporánea en México, Mexico, 1993.
"Presidentialisme en democratie. Het geval van Mexico", in Drie Kwesties in Latijns Amerikas, L. Malaver and M. Oostra., ed. LASO, Amsterdam, 2002.
"Decision on the Follow-up to the OPCW Action Plan on Article VII: Ensuring the Effective Implementation of the Chemical Weapons Convention", with L. Tabassi and Ralf Trapp, The CBW Conventions Bulletin, 69–70, September–December 2005, pp. 5–10.
"Lessons learned: Chemicals trader convicted of war crimes", with B. Exterkate, L. Tabassi and E. van der Borght, Journal Judiciaire de La Haye, volume 2, number 1, 2007, pp. 23–42.
"Sustaining follow-up to the Action Plan on Article VII: National Implementation of the Chemical Weapons Convention", with M. Lak, L. Tabassi and K-S. Melzer, in Chemical Disarmament, volume 5, number 1, March 2007, pp. 18–24.
"Industry Role in the Non-proliferation of Chemical Weapons", International Law Association, 74th Conference, The Hague, August 2010.
"The Chemical Weapons Convention: An Overview", Audiovisual Library of International Law, UN, 2010. 
"The Relation between Due Process in International and National Human Rights Instruments and International Adjudication Mechanisms", en The Development and Effectiveness of International Administrative Law, edited by O. Elias, Martinus Nijhoff, Leiden-Boston, 2012, pp. 375–385.

References

External links 
 Lecture by Santiago Oñate Laborde entitled The Chemical Weapons Convention: an Overview in Lecture Series of the United Nations Audiovisual Library of International Law
 Santiago Oñate Laborde's profile on the website of the Permanent Mission of Mexico to the Council of Europe.

|-

|-

|-

|-

Living people
20th-century Mexican lawyers
Presidents of the Institutional Revolutionary Party
Presidents of the Chamber of Deputies (Mexico)
Mexican Secretaries of Labor
Mexican people of Basque descent
1949 births
Ambassadors of Mexico to the Netherlands
Ambassadors of Mexico to the United Kingdom
Permanent Representatives of Mexico to the Organization of American States
Members of the Congress of Mexico City
National Autonomous University of Mexico alumni
Alumni of the London School of Economics
University of Wisconsin–Madison alumni
University of Wisconsin–Madison faculty
Academic staff of Universidad Autónoma Metropolitana
Academic staff of the National Autonomous University of Mexico
Academic staff of Leiden University
Politicians from Mexico City